The Indrayani River originates in Kurvande village near Lonavla, a hill station in the Sahyadri mountains of Maharashtra, India. Fed by rain, it flows east from there to meet the Bhima river, through the Hindu pilgrimage centers of Dehu and Alandi. It follows a course mostly north of the city of Pune. It is revered as a holy river and is associated with religious figures such as Sant Tukaram and Dnyaneshwar.

There is a hydroelectric dam called Valvan Dam on the Indrayani at Kamshet.

See also

List of rivers of India
Rivers of India

References

Rivers of Maharashtra
Geography of Pune district
Rivers of India